The following is a timeline of the history of the city of Le Havre, France.

Prior to 20th century

 1516 – Harbour construction begins.
 1520 - Belltower of Le Havre Cathedral.
 1524 - Port of Le Havre opened.
 1562 - Town delivered over to the keeping of Queen Elizabeth I by Louis, Prince of Condé.
 1563 - English, under Ambrose Dudley, 3rd Earl of Warwick expelled.
 1572 - Despatched vessels for whale and cod-fishing at Spitsbergen and Newfoundland.
 1669 - The oldest of the nine harbour basins dates from here.
 1672 – Le Havre becomes the "entrepôt of the French East India Company."
 1694 – Le Havre besieged by Anglo-Dutch forces during the Nine Years' War.
 1750 – Journal du Havre newspaper begins publication.
 1752 – Almanach de la Marine au Havre published.
 1772 – City directory published.
 1790 – Le Havre becomes part of the Seine Inférieure souveraineté.
 1800 –  (library) opens.
 1806 – Population: 19,482.
 1833 –  founded.
 1839 – Courrier du Havre newspaper begins publication.
 1845 – Musée des Beaux-Arts opens.
 1847
 Le Havre station opened.
 Paris–Le Havre railway begins operating.
 1848 –  founded.
 1851 – Population: 56,964.
 1857 – Le Havre City Hall built.
 1864 –  (bank) established.
 1868 – Le Havre newspaper begins publication.
 1874 –  begins operating.
 1876 – Population: 92,068.
 1881
 Petit Havre newspaper begins publication.
  opens.
 1884 – Société de géographie du Havre founded.
 1886 – Population: 112,074.
 1887 - Canal de Tancarville completed.

20th century

 1904 – Havre-Eclair newspaper begins publication.
 1905 –  football club formed.
 1906 - Population: 129,403.
 1911 – Population: 136,159.
 1913 – Société linnéenne de la Seine-Maritime founded.
 1919 – The village of Graville-Sainte-Honnorine is annexed by Le Havre.
 1928 –  begins operating.
 1932 – Gare du Havre rebuilt.
 1940 – May: Bombing of city by Allied forces begins (→Bombing of France during World War II).
 1944 – September: greatest destruction of the city centre and the port during bombings of the British Royal Air Force, more than 5,000 dead (Operation Astonia).   
 1945 – Rebuilding begins ("75% of Le Havre was leveled in Second World War").(fr)
 1958 – Le Havre City Hall rebuilt.
 1961 – Museum of modern art opens.
 1968 –  newspaper in publication.
 1971 –  becomes mayor.
 1974 – Roman Catholic Diocese of Le Havre established.
 1975 – Population: 217,882.
 1984 – Le Havre twinned with Pointe-Noire, Republic of the Congo.
 1985 – Le Havre twinned with Dalian, China.
 1990 – Population: 195,854.
 1995 – Antoine Rufenacht becomes mayor.

21st century

 2008 –  established.
 2010
 Édouard Philippe becomes mayor.
 Population: 177,259.
 2011
 Le Havre twinned with Magdeburg, Germany.
 Population: 174,156.
 2012 – Le Havre tramway begins operating.
 2014 – March:  held.
 2015
 Le Havre Normandy University opened.
 December:  held.
 2016 – Le Havre becomes part of Normandy (administrative region).

Images

See also
 History of Le Havre
 
 History of Normandy region

other cities in the Normandy region
 Timeline of Caen
 Timeline of Rouen

References

This article incorporates information from the French Wikipedia.

Bibliography

in English

in French
 
 
  1880–1885

External links

 Items related to Le Havre, various dates (via Europeana).
 Items related to Le Havre, various dates (via Digital Public Library of America).
Le Havre de Grace on the 1750 Cassini Map
1900 Summer Olympics official report 
1924 Summer Olympics official report 
A photographic record of the storm of iron & fire; Le Havre 1944

havre
Le Havre
havre